The tirante is a silvery, elongated cutlass fish found in waters off Cuba.

References 

Fish of the Caribbean
Trichiuridae
Vertebrates of Cuba